Louise Moriarty (born 22 December 1978) is an Irish racing cyclist from Dublin. She was the Irish National Time Trial Champion in 2006 and 2007.

In 2008, Moriarty broke the national pursuit record at Newport Velodrome, Wales, setting a new time of 3:55.853, beating the old record of 3:59.194 by over three seconds. The new record took her within two seconds of qualifying for the world championships. She also became the Irish 500m TT, points race, scratch race and pursuit champion.

Palmarès

2002
3rd Irish National Road Race Championships
2nd Irish National Time Trial Championships

2005
3rd Irish National Road Race Championships

2006
1st  Irish National Time Trial Championships
2nd Irish National Road Race Championships

2007
1st Tielt-Winge (BEL)
1st  Irish National Time Trial Championships
3rd Irish National Road Race Championships

2008
1st  500m TT, Irish National Track Championships
1st  Points race, Irish National Track Championships
1st  Scratch race, Irish National Track Championships
1st  Pursuit, Irish National Track Championships
3rd Irish National Time Trial Championships
2nd Irish National Road Race Championships
2nd Brasschaat/Maria-ter-Heide (BEL)
1st General Classification Ras na mBan (IRL)
1st Stage 1 Ras na mBan, Sneem (IRL)
1st Stage 2 Ras na mBan, Sneem (IRL)

2011
2nd Irish National Road Race Championships

References

External links
Swift racing rider profiles

1978 births
Living people
Irish female cyclists
Scholars of Trinity College Dublin